The 2002 World Series of Poker (WSOP) was held at Binion's Horseshoe.

The 2002 WSOP was historically notable for two reasons. The series was the first WSOP in which pocket cams were installed to allow broadcasters (on tape delay) to show the players' hole cards, although only for the Main Event (today, the cameras are used at most WSOP events), and it was also the last WSOP before the 2003 Main Event victory of amateur Chris Moneymaker helped launch the 2000s poker boom.

Preliminary events

Main Event
There were 631 entrants to the main event. Each paid $10,000 to enter what was the largest poker tournament (by prize pool) ever played in a brick and mortar casino at the time.

Final table

*Career statistics prior to the beginning of the 2002 Main Event.

Final table results

Note: Phil Hellmuth, as part of ESPN's broadcast team, during the first hour of their final table coverage said he would shave his head if Robert Varkonyi won the tournament. At the conclusion of the tournament, Hellmuth is seen having his head shaved.

Other high finishes
NB: This list is restricted to top 30 finishers with an existing Wikipedia entry.

In pop culture
In "Casino Night", the 22nd episode of the second season of the American comedy television series The Office, it is revealed that Kevin Malone, a character on the show, won a World Series of Poker bracelet for No-Limit Deuce-Seven Draw in 2002.

References

World Series of Poker
World Series of Poker